Arup K. Chakraborty is an American engineer, focusing in biophysics, computational modeling and infectious disease, currently the Robert T. Haslam Professor at Massachusetts Institute of Technology and formerly the Warren and Katherine Schlinger Distinguished Professor at University of California, Berkeley.

References

Living people
MIT School of Engineering faculty
21st-century American engineers
University of Delaware alumni
University of Minnesota alumni
1961 births
Members of the National Academy of Medicine
American people of Indian descent